Eurytermes ceylonicus, is a species of termite of the genus Eurytermes. It is native to India and Sri Lanka.

References

External links

Termites
Insects described in 1913
Insects of India